Nicolas "Nick" St. Pierre (born March 7, 1985) is a Canadian professional ice hockey defenceman who is contracted with Tohoku Free Blades in Japan for the 2018-19 AL season. He most recently played with EC KAC of the Austrian Hockey League (EBEL). He played with HC Plzeň in the Czech Extraliga during the 2010–11 Czech Extraliga season.

After three seasons with Champions HC Plzeň, St. Pierre left for Germany, signing a one-year contract with Krefeld Pinguine of the Deutsche Eishockey Liga (DEL) on May 7, 2013.

Awards and honours

References

External links

1985 births
Canadian ice hockey defencemen
Gwinnett Gladiators players
HC Plzeň players
EC KAC players
Krefeld Pinguine players
Ice hockey people from Quebec
Living people
Norfolk Admirals players
Reading Royals players
Syracuse Crunch players
Tohoku Free Blades players
Canadian expatriate ice hockey players in the Czech Republic
Canadian expatriate ice hockey players in Austria
Canadian expatriate ice hockey players in Germany
Canadian expatriate ice hockey players in the United States
Canadian expatriate ice hockey players in Japan
People from Beauharnois, Quebec